Eastern Cemetery is a historic cemetery at the intersection of Washington Avenue and Congress Street in the East Bayside neighborhood of Portland, Maine.  Established in 1668, it is the city's oldest historic site, and has more than 4,000 marked graves.  It was listed on the National Register of Historic Places in 1973.

The cemetery has been maintained since 2006 by the non-profit group Spirits Alive, who offer tours four days a week: Saturday, Sunday, Wednesday and Thursday.

Description and history
Eastern Cemetery is located on the northeastern part of the Portland's peninsula, at the base of Munjoy Hill, occupying a roughly triangular lot bounded on the north by Congress Street, the east by Mountfort Street, and the south by Federal Street. The sloping lot is only at street level along Congress and part of Mountfort Street, the rest supported by a stone retaining wall. Its street-facing sides are ringed by iron fencing, with the main entrance on Congress Street, marked by pairs of granite posts. Chain-link fencing runs along the southwestern boundary with abutting properties. The cemetery, which has twelve sections (including special areas for Quakers, Catholics and blacks), is mostly grass, with occasional trees that are generally volunteer growth. It is the oldest historic site in Portland. Established as a public burial ground in 1668, 36 years after European settlers first arrived in the area, it now has more than 4,000 graves, with an estimated further 3,000 people in unmarked plots.

There are 95 underground tombs, which were built to house about thirty coffins each. The Dead House, which was constructed in 1871, is located inside the front gate. It houses a tomb, built in 1849, to store bodies over the winter when the ground was too frozen to dig.

Gallows, from which at least one hanging occurred, and stocks are no longer in place.

The retaining walls along Mountfort and Federal Streets date from 1854 and 1868, respectively. The iron and granite fence along Congress Street was erected in 1916, having been moved from Portland High School.

Mary Green
Mary Green's head and foot stone mark the oldest known burial of May 23, 1717. Green is believed to be one of the settlers driven from the area by the American Indians between 1689 and 1690. She returned twenty years later.

Other notable burials
 James Alden, Jr. (1810–1877), Civil War, Mexican–American War
 George Bradbury (1770–1823), US Congressman
 Lieutenant William Ward Burrows II (1785–1813), U.S. War of 1812, commander of the USS Enterprise, killed in the line of duty during the capture of HMS Boxer on September 5, 1813
 Charles Q. Clapp (1799–1868), architect and merchant
 Charles Codman (1800–1842), American landscape and marine painter
 Mark Harris (1779–1843), US Congressman
 John Holmes (1773–1843), US Congressman
 Daniel Ilsley (1740–1813), US Congressman
 Hermann Kotzschmar (1829–1908), German-American organist at Portland's First Parish Church for 47 years
 Captain Lemuel Moody (1767–1846), creator of the Portland Observatory
 Commodore Edward Preble (1761–1807), US Naval officer
 George Preble (1816–1885), US Naval officer and writer
 William Widgery (1753–1822), US Congressman
Henry Aiken Worcester (1802-1841), minister & vegetarian

Monuments
 Lieutenant Henry Wadsworth (died 1804), uncle of Henry Wadsworth Longfellow, who was killed, aged 20, while attempting to blow up a pirate ship off the Barbary Coast. Attempts to return his remains from a grave in Tripoli have been unsuccessful

See also
 National Register of Historic Places listings in Portland, Maine

References

External links
 Spirits Alive Friends of Eastern Cemetery
 

Cemeteries in Portland, Maine
1668 establishments in the Thirteen Colonies
Cemeteries on the National Register of Historic Places in Maine
Munjoy Hill
National Register of Historic Places in Portland, Maine